The 1962 All-Ireland Intermediate Hurling Championship was the second staging of the All-Ireland hurling championship. The championship ended on 9 September 1962.

Wexford were the defending champions, however, they were defeated in the provincial championship. Carlow won the title after defeating London by 6–15 to 3–3 in the final.

References

Intermediate
All-Ireland Intermediate Hurling Championship